Biljana Crvenkoska (born 6 September 1983 in Skopje, Socialist Republic of Macedonia) is a retired Macedonian handball player.

External links
 
 Profile at Scoresway
 EHF CL Profile
 

1983 births
Living people
Macedonian female handball players
Sportspeople from Skopje